"Tears of the Dragon" is the first single from Bruce Dickinson's second solo album, Balls to Picasso, released on 28 May 1994. Allmusic called "Tears of the Dragon" a "magnificent" track, "by far the album's best song".

Track listing 
CD 1
 Tears of the Dragon –  6:23
 The Breeding House –  5:20
 No Way Out... to be Continued –  7:31

CD 2
 Tears of the Dragon (Acoustic chill-out) –  4:34
 Winds of Change –  4:15
 Spirit of Joy –  3:13

Credits
 Bruce Dickinson – vocals
 Roy Z – Guitar
 Eddie Cassillas – Bass guitar
 Dickie Fliszar – Drums

Chart positions

References 

1994 singles
Bruce Dickinson songs
Songs written by Bruce Dickinson
1994 songs
Music videos directed by Howard Greenhalgh